Agostino Inveges (1595 – April 1677) was an Italian historian, known as "the Historian of Palermo".

Life
Born in Sciacca, he first studied with the Jesuits, graduating in theology and philosophy. He died in Palermo in 1677, at the age of 82. He is buried in the Baroque church of Sant'Ignazio all'Olivella, in Palermo.

Inveges is chiefly remembered for his three-volume history of Palermo, Annali della felice Città di Palermo (1649-1651). The three volumes cover the period 2077 B.C. (the foundation of the city) to 1279 A.D.

In opposition to humanist rhetorical historiography, Inveges concluded the preface to the first volume of his huge history of Palermo, caming out against historians who employ “pretty descriptions, capricious metaphors, scheming admonitions, or other ornaments allowed to poets and academicians”. He showed concern for critical, source-based historical research, showing affinities with the new approaches of contemporary historians like the Maurists in Paris and the Bollandists in Antwerp.

Works
Annali della felice città di Palermo, prima sedia, corona del Re, e Capo del Regno di Sicilia..., Palermo, nella stamparia di Pietro dell'Isola, in 3 voll.: part I, 1649 part II, 1650 part III, 1651
Historia sacra Paradisi terrestris et sanctissimi innocentiae status, Palermo, 1649 (also including an Italian translation, 1651) 
La Cartagine siciliana, historia divisa in tre libri, Palermo, nella typographia di Giuseppe Bisagni:  1651 edition; 1661 edition
Annales regni Siciliae

Published posthumously
 
 Panormus antiqua: sive Urbis felicis [...] & capitis regni Siciliæ, æræ tres, heroica, Carthaginensis, & Romana, in "Thesaurus Antiquitatum et Historiarum Siciliae,... Sardiniae et Corsicae Aliarumque Adjacentium", Volumen Decimun Quartum, sumptibus Petri Vander Aa, 1725 
 Carthago sicula... Ex italicis latina fecit... Sigebertus Havercampus, sumptibus P. Van der Aa, 1725

References

External links 
 

17th-century Italian historians
People from Sciacca
1595 births
1677 deaths
Writers from the Province of Agrigento
Italian non-fiction writers